Wallace Bishop (February 17, 1906 – May 2, 1986) was an American swing jazz drummer.

Bishop was born in Chicago, Illinois.  He started on drums as a teenager, studying under Jimmy Bertrand. His first professional gig was with Art Sims and his Crole Roof Orchestra in Milwaukee, which he joined in 1926; around this time he also played with Jelly Roll Morton, Bernie Young, Hughie Swift, Richard M. Jones, and Tommy Dorsey. From 1928 to 1930 he played with Erskine Tate and, following this, with the Earl Hines Orchestra from 1931 to 1937. In the 1940s he played with Jimmie Noone (1941), Coleman Hawkins (1943), Don Redman, Phil Moore, Walter "Foots" Thomas, John Kirby (1946), Sy Oliver, Sammy Price, and Billy Kyle.

While touring Europe with Buck Clayton in 1949, Bishop elected to remain there, and found work both with noted European jazz musicians and with touring or expatriate Americans, including Bill Coleman, Don Byas, Ben Webster, Kid Ory, Milt Buckner, Buddy Tate, and T-Bone Walker. Bishop recorded only two pieces as a bandleader in 1950, with a trio, but he continued to record regularly into the 1970s.

He died in Hilversum, the Netherlands, aged 80.

References
Scott Yanow, [ Wallace Bishop] at Allmusic

American jazz drummers
Musicians from Chicago
1986 deaths
1906 births
20th-century American drummers
American male drummers
Jazz musicians from Illinois
20th-century American male musicians
American male jazz musicians
Black & Blue Records artists